VTV-1 was originally a Soviet type 1125 armored motor boat with the designation No 215. It was captured by Finnish troops in 1941, after it had been damaged by artillery fire and beached by its crew. The Finns swiftly repaired the ship, and in October 1941 VTV-1 took part in a reconnaissance-in-force aimed at the island of Sommers.

VTV-1 was transferred to Lake Onega in June 1942. It was the only ship of the "Onega Flotilla" that could truly be considered a match for any of the opposing Soviet naval vessels on the lake. Once Finnish forces started withdrawing from Onega VTV-1 was transported by rail to Finland. The ship was returned to the Soviet Union in 1944.

References

Patrol vessels of the Finnish Navy
1939 ships
Captured ships
Ships built in the Soviet Union